Maurice Hall may refer to:

Fiction
Maurice Hall, the main character in Maurice (novel)
Maurice Hall, the main character in Maurice (film)

People
Maurice Hall, player on the 2002 Ohio State Buckeyes football team and 2003 Ohio State Buckeyes football team
Maurice Hall, a founder of Jazz Bakery
Maurice Hall (cricketer)